Oxymeris caledonica is a species of sea snail, a marine gastropod mollusc in the family Terebridae, the auger snails.

Description
The shell size varies between 40 mm and 75 mm.

Distribution
This species occurs along New Caledonia.

References

 Bratcher T. & Cernohorsky W.O. (1987). Living terebras of the world. A monograph of the recent Terebridae of the world. American Malacologists, Melbourne, Florida & Burlington, Massachusetts. 240pp
 Terryn Y. (2007). Terebridae: A Collectors Guide. Conchbooks & NaturalArt. 59pp + plates.

External links
 Gastropods.com : Acus caledonicus;accessed : 31 March
  Sowerby, G. B., III. (1909). Descriptions of new species of Terebra, Pleurotoma, Trochus, Tellina, Dosina, and Modiola. Proceedings of the Malacological Society of London. 8(4): 198–201.
 Fedosov, A. E.; Malcolm, G.; Terryn, Y.; Gorson, J.; Modica, M. V.; Holford, M.; Puillandre, N. (2020). Phylogenetic classification of the family Terebridae (Neogastropoda: Conoidea). Journal of Molluscan Studies. 85(4): 359-388

Terebridae
Gastropods described in 1909